Grylloblattella pravdini is a species of insect in the family Grylloblattidae. Its type locality is Teletskoye Lake, Altai Republic, Russia.

Habitat
It can be found alongside rocky stream banks and in talus fields.

References

Grylloblattidae
Insects of Russia